Neuss I is an electoral constituency (German: Wahlkreis) represented in the Bundestag. It elects one member via first-past-the-post voting. Under the current constituency numbering system, it is designated as constituency 108. It is located in western North Rhine-Westphalia, comprising the southeastern part of the district of Rhein-Kreis Neuss.

Neuss I was created for the inaugural 1949 federal election. Since 2005, it has been represented by Hermann Gröhe of the Christian Democratic Union (CDU).

Geography
Neuss I is located in western North Rhine-Westphalia. As of the 2021 federal election, it comprises the municipalities of Dormagen, Grevenbroich, Neuss, and Rommerskirchen from the Rhein-Kreis Neuss district.

History
Neuss I was created in 1949, then known as Neuss-Grevenbroich. In the 1965 through 1976 elections, it was named Neuss-Grevenbroich I. It acquired its current name in the 1980 election. In the 1949 election, it was North Rhine-Westphalia constituency 21 in the numbering system. From 1953 through 1961, it was number 80. From 1965 through 1976, it was number 77. From 1980 through 1998, it was number 76. From 2002 through 2009, it was number 109. Since 2013, it has been number 108.

Originally, the constituency comprised the independent city of Neuss and the district of Grevenbroich. From 1965 through 1976, it comprised the independent city of Neuss and the municipalities of Dormagen, Kaarst, Korschenbroich, and Meerbusch from Grevenbroich district. From 1980 through 1998, it comprised the municipalities of Neuss and Dormagen from Rhein-Kreis Neuss. It acquired its current borders in the 2002 election.

Members
The constituency has been held by the Christian Democratic Union (CDU) during all but one Bundestag term since 1949. It was first represented by Richard Muckermann from 1949 to 1961. He was succeeded by Josef Rommerskirchen from 1965 to 1976, followed by Heinz Günther Hüsch until 1990. Bertold Mathias Reinartz served two terms from 1990 to 1998. Hermann Gröhe was then elected in 1998, but defeated in 2002 by Kurt Bodewig of the Social Democratic Party (SPD). Hermann Gröhe regained the constituency in 2005, and was re-elected in 2009, 2013, 2017, and 2021.

Election results

2021 election

2017 election

2013 election

2009 election

Notes

References

Federal electoral districts in North Rhine-Westphalia
Rhein-Kreis Neuss
Constituencies established in 1949
1949 establishments in West Germany